Choqa Pahneh (also Romanized as Choqā Pahneh; also known as Cheqāh Pahneh, Cheqā Pahran and Choghā Pahneh) is a village in Kuhsar Rural District, in the Central District of Shazand County, Markazi Province, Iran. At the 2006 census, its population was 129, in 30 families.

References 

Populated places in Shazand County